The Little Signal Hills are a low mountain range in the Transverse Ranges, in southeastern Kern County, California.

References 

Mountain ranges of Kern County, California
Transverse Ranges
Hills of California
Mountain ranges of Southern California